Fair Exchange is a 1936 British comedy film directed by Ralph Ince and starring Patric Knowles, Raymond Lovell and Cecil Humphreys. It was made at Teddington Studios as a quota quickie by the British subsidiary of Warner Brothers.

Cast
 Patric Knowles as Tony Meredith
 Roscoe Ates as Elmer Goodge
 Isla Bevan as Elsie Randall
 Raymond Lovell as Sir Reeves Willoughby
 Cecil Humphreys as Matthew Randall
 Louis Goodrich as James Meredith
 Morland Graham as Dr. Franz Schmidt

References

Bibliography
 Chibnall, Steve. Quota Quickies: The British of the British 'B' Film. British Film Institute, 2007.
 Low, Rachael. Filmmaking in 1930s Britain. George Allen & Unwin, 1985.
 Wood, Linda. British Films, 1927-1939. British Film Institute, 1986.

External links

1936 films
1930s English-language films
Films directed by Ralph Ince
1936 comedy films
British comedy films
Films shot at Teddington Studios
Warner Bros. films
British black-and-white films
1930s British films